Cardenden is a Scottish town located on the south bank of the River Ore in the parish of Auchterderran, Fife. Cardenden was named in 1848 by the Edinburgh and Northern Railway for its new railway station. A former mining town, Cardenden had a reported population of 448 in 1891 that had increased to 5,533 as of 2011.

Areas of Cardenden include Auchterderran, Bowhill, Dundonald, the Jamphlars, New Carden and Woodend.

Last Scottish duel
It is reported that the last duel on Scottish soil took place in a field at Cardenbarns to the south of Cardenden.  On 2 August 1826, a Kirkcaldy merchant named David Landale fought a duel with George Morgan, a Kirkcaldy banker and retired Lieutenant from the 77th Regiment of Foot. Morgan was killed by wounds received from a pistol ball. Landale was tried and subsequently cleared of his murder at Perth Sheriff Court.

The original pistols that David Landale used in the duel are housed in the Kirkcaldy Museum and Art Gallery. The duel was the subject of an episode of Timewatch on BBC television, broadcast on 9 February 2007 entitled "The Last Duel". The site is now the location of the Fife Community Off Road Motorcycle Club.

Sport
Cardenden is home to the football club Dundonald Bluebell, who play in the East of Scotland League.

Also in the area is the Bowhill Leisure Centre, which has a swimming pool, sauna, steam room and gymnasium.  The Auchterderran Golf Course was founded in 1904.

Notable people

 Joe Corrie
 Tommy Hutchison
 Willie Johnston
 Willie Mathieson
 William McLaren
 John Thomson 
 Ian Rankin

See also
 Cardenden railway station
 List of famous duels
 List of places in Fife

References

External links

Gazetteer on Cardenden
History of Cardenden
Scottish mining villages - Auchterderran Parish

Towns in Fife
Mining communities in Fife
Cardenden